JDS Motobu (LST-4102) was the second ship of the s of the Japanese Maritime Self-Defense Force. She was commissioned on 21 December 1973.

Development and design
This gave them a maximum speed of 
.  

Vessels of the class carried two Landing Craft Vehicle Personnel (LCVPs). The LCVPs were slung under davits and a traveling gantry crane with folding rails that could be extended over the side handled the two LCMs positioned on the foredeck. The LSTs could carry up 130 troops. The Atsumi class were armed with twin-mounted  guns in a single turret placed each at the bow and aft. The LSTs were equipped with OPS-9 air search. They had a complement of 100 officers and crew.

Construction and career 
She was laid down by Sasebo Heavy Industries on April 23, 1972 as the No. 4102 planned transport ship in 1970 based on the 4th Defense Force Development Plan, launched on August 3, 1973. It was commissioned on 21 December 1973 and was incorporated into the Yokosuka District Force as a ship under direct control.

On April 12, 1999, she was decommissioned. The total itinerary reached 345,823 nautical miles.

Citations

External links

Atsumi-class tank landing ships
Ships built by Sasebo Naval Arsenal
1973 ships